Kouere is a town in the Sidéradougou Department of Comoé Province in southwestern Burkina Faso. It is near the city of Bobo-Dioulasso and has a population of 3,195.

References

Populated places in the Cascades Region